The 1997 New York/New Jersey MetroStars season was the franchise's second year of existence and their second year in the top-tier of American soccer. The MetroStars played in Major League Soccer's Eastern Conference for the second consecutive season.

The MetroStars failed to qualify for the playoffs by finishing fifth in the Eastern Conference. Outside of MLS play, the MetroStars reached the semifinals of the U.S. Open Cup. There, the MetroStars lost to eventual Open Cup champions, Dallas Burn.

Player statistics

Top scorers

As of 31 December 1997.

References

New York Red Bulls seasons
Metrostars
American soccer clubs 1997 season